Rune Støstad (born 8 January 1972) is a Norwegian politician for the Labour Party. From 2021 he represents Oppland and the Labour Party at the Parlament.

Career
Born on 8 January 1972, Støstad is a journalist by education from the Volda University College, and also has a degree from the BI Norwegian Business School. Hailing from Vinstra, he was a member of the municipal council of Nord-Fron from 2011, and was mayor in Nord-Fron from to 2015 to 2021.

He was elected representative to the Storting from the constituency of Oppland for the period 2021–2025, for the Labour Party.

References

1972 births
Living people
Labour Party (Norway) politicians
Oppland politicians
Mayors of places in Norway
Members of the Storting